Pod corn or wild maize is a variety of maize. It is not a wild ancestor of maize but rather a mutant that forms leaves around each kernel.

Pod corn (tunicata Sturt) is not grown commercially, but it is preserved in some localities.

Pod corn forms glumes around each kernel which is caused by a mutation at the Tunicate locus. Because of its bizarre appearance, pod corn has had a religious significance to certain Native American tribes.

The six major types of corn are dent corn, flint corn, pod corn, popcorn, flour corn, and sweet corn.

References

Maize